The Mezzalama Trophy (a.k.a. white marathon) is an Italian high altitude ski mountaineering competition in upper Valtournenche and Ayas valleys, in Aosta Valley.

The Mezzalama Trophy, which belongs to the "big three of ski mountaineering" besides the two other best-known and classical ski mountaineering events, the Patrouille des Glaciers and the Pierra Menta, is the highest alpine ski mountaineering competition of the world. The event in the Monte Rosa's massif was named in honor of the mountain guide Ottorino Mezzalama.

The Mezzalama Trophy is a stage of La Grande Course that includes the most important ski mountaineering competitions of the season.

History 
The Mezzalama Trophy Foundation was founded by friends of Ottorino Mezzalama in 1933 in his memory, one of them was Mario Corti. The race was held every year from 1933 and to 1938. Entry was open only to men; the first female participant is presumed to be Paula Wiesinger, who had been invited to view the race in 1935. When Giusto Gervasutti withdrew due to injury, she put on his military uniform and cap and, wearing sunglasses, ran instead of him, but was discovered at a checkpoint. The 1935 Trofeo Mezzalama was filmed by Mario Craveri in his film "Maratona Bianca".

After 1938 the race was discontinued (except that in 1940 a platonic race was carried out under the name marcia nazionale Ottorino Mezzalama by the Ski Club Torino). Further races were held in 1971, 1973, 1975, and in 1978, and the Mezzalama Trophy was revived as a regular biennial race with the eleventh race in 1997.

In 1975, the Mezzalama Trophy was held as World Championship of Skimountaineering. 33 civilian teams, 12 mountain guide teams and 11 military teams participated in this event. In that year, the first female team competed officially. Together with the Pierra Menta and the Tour du Rutor event, the Mezzalama Trophy is part of the Trophée des Alpes (French for Alps' Trophy) series.

Editions and winners 
The list shows the winning teams for each edition of the Trofeo Mezzalama.

In 1934, all competing teams were overtaken by the German reserve racer Anderl Heckmair, who started as a single racer one and a half hours after the teams left.

Literature 
 Umberto Pelazza, Antonio Vizzi: Il Trofeo Mezzalama 1933-1997 : Storia e leggenda della sci-alpinistica piu alta del mondo (Italian) (Aosta) - ed. La Vallee, 1999
 Rolf Majcen: Bergauf - Abenteuer Ausdauersport (German)

References

External links 
 Official Website
 Mezzalama at euroski-on-line.com

Ski mountaineering competitions
Skiing in Italy
Sport in Aosta Valley
1933 in Italy
1933 in Italian sport